Shibsagar Singh (born 15 September 1979) is an Indian former cricketer. He played 28 first-class matches for Bengal between 1996 and 2010.

See also
 List of Bengal cricketers

References

External links
 

1979 births
Living people
Indian cricketers
Bengal cricketers
People from Bardhaman